The Wychwood Way is a waymarked long-distance footpath in southern England in the United Kingdom.

Length of the Route

The route runs for 59.5 km (37 mi).

The route

The Wychwood Way runs through the ancient Royal Forest of Wychwood in West Oxfordshire.

It is a circular walk and starts from Woodstock, Oxfordshire passing through Stonesfield, Chadlington, Ascott-under-Wychwood, Leafield, Ramsden, North Leigh, East End, Oxfordshire, incorporates part of the Roman road of Akeman Street and the older route of the Saltway crossing Blenheim Park and links in with the Oxfordshire Way.

External links
Long Distance Walkers Association website info
The Wychwood Project website

Long-distance footpaths in England
West Oxfordshire District
Footpaths in Oxfordshire